Lake Rotopokaka is a dune lake in the Far North District of New Zealand. It is adjacent to Tokerau Beach on the east coast of the Karikari Peninsula. The lake is also known as 'Coca Cola lake' as the peat and tannins in the water give the lake a distinct 'cola' colour.

The lake has no inflows or outflows. The surrounding catchment is a mixture of manuka scrub, pohutukawa, cabbage tree and flax.

The lake is a popular recreation area and can be accessed off Ramp Road.

References

External links
Karikari Peninsula – Department of Conservation 

Far North District
Rotopokaka Lake